S-methyl-5'-thioadenosine deaminase (MTA deaminase, 5-methylthioadenosine deaminase) is an enzyme with systematic name S-methyl-5'-thioadenosine amidohydrolase. This enzyme catalyses the following chemical reaction

 S-methyl-5'-thioadenosine + H2O  5'-S-methyl-5'-thioinosine + NH3

The enzyme from Thermotoga maritima also functions as S-adenosylhomocysteine deaminase (EC 3.5.4.28).

References

External links 
 

EC 3.5.4